Latona is the Roman equivalent of Leto, a goddess in Greek mythology.

Latona may also refer to:

Ships
 , several ships of the Royal Navy
 , a World War II US Navy stores ship
 Latona (ship), two merchant ships

Places
 639 Latona, an asteroid
 Latona, Illinois, United States, an unincorporated community
 Latona Township, Walsh County, North Dakota, United States
 Latona, an area that is now part of Northlake, Seattle, Washington, United States

Other uses
 Latona Fountain, in the gardens of the Chateau of Versailles
 Amanda Latona, a member of the American girl group Innosense
 Tim Latona, a former member of the American metalcore band Botch

See also

LaTonya, given name